Rainey Funeral Home Building, also known as Roller-Brllce Funeral Home, Barber-Barto Funeral Home, Barber-Edwards Funeral Home, Barber-Edwards-Arthur Funeral Home, Arthur Funeral Home, and Arthur's Colonial Chapel, is a historic funeral home located at Marshfield, Webster County, Missouri. It was built about 1938, and consists of a -story rectangular main building, two-story tower, and a one-story wing. It is in the Tudor Revival style.  It is of wood frame and steel construction with a facade of native Webster County fieldstone with raised mortar joints. The building features a round tower with a conical roof and glass block windows.

It was listed on the National Register of Historic Places in 2014.

References

Commercial buildings on the National Register of Historic Places in Missouri
Tudor Revival architecture in Missouri
Commercial buildings completed in 1938
Buildings and structures in Webster County, Missouri
National Register of Historic Places in Webster County, Missouri